Dental Hypotheses is a quarterly peer-reviewed open access medical journal covering all aspects of dentistry. It was established in 2010 by Jafar Kolahi and Edward F. Rossomando. The journal is published by Medknow Publications and the editor-in-chief is Edward F. Rossomando (University of Connecticut). It is an official journal of the American Biodontics Society and the Center for Research and Education in Technology. The latest SJR report shows that the level of the journal has been increased significantly to Q4 (2020). Dental Hypotheses is a member of Committee on Publication Ethics (COPE).

Abstracting and indexing
The journal is abstracted and indexed in Chemical Abstracts Service, EBSCO databases, Emerging Sources Citation Index (JCI=0.11), ProQuest databases, and Scopus.

See also
Biodontics
Medical Hypotheses

References

External links

Medknow Publications academic journals
Quarterly journals
Dentistry journals
English-language journals
Publications established in 2010